The 2001 Alaska Aces season was the 16th season of the franchise in the Philippine Basketball Association (PBA).

Draft picks

Transactions

Occurrences
Former best import awardee and the league's second recipient of the Mr.100% award, Sean Chambers, the winningest PBA import, announced his retirement after three games into the Governor's Cup, Chambers came in as a replacement for Terrance Badgett during the Commissioner's Cup and led the Aces to the semifinal round.

Roster

 Team Manager: Joaquin Trillo

Elimination round

Games won

References

Alaska Aces (PBA) seasons
Alaska